Bernate Ticino (Milanese:  , locally  ) is a comune (municipality) in the Metropolitan City of Milan in the northern Italian region Lombardy, located about  west of Milan.

The town is located by the Ticino river and it is crossed by the Naviglio Grande. In 2005 a small Roman necropolis, including 12 tombs, has been found in Bernate's territory.

Geography

Territory 

Bernate is located at east of Ticino (river) and at west of Milan, capital of Province, from which it is about 30 kilometers far away. It borders: to the north Cuggiono (through the hamlet of Casate), to the east Mesero and Marcallo con Casone, to the south Boffalora sopra Ticino and to the west with the Piedmont territory of Romentino.

The town is divided into two distinct areas: a central-western one, containing the city center but characterized by less dense settlements and with the presence of forest vegetation that extends up to the Parco del Ticino, and an eastern one by greater urbanized presence. The two areas are substantially separated by the Naviglio Grande and are connected by a historic seventeenth-century bridge. 
The most recent residential settlements extend to the western and western extremities of the town, while the industrial area is gathered in a wide area on the western side of the town, at the border with the municipality of Boffalora sopra Ticino.

Geology and Hydrography 
Morphologically, the territory of Bernate Ticino is characterized by the typical environment of the Pianura Padana but it is articulated between high ground, descending areas in correspondence of the banks of the watercourses and marshy areas. The average altitude is 130 m s.m.l. A characteristic aspect of the hydrography of Bernate Ticino is the presence of the Naviglio Grande and of the Ticino (river) in the westernmost part of the town. Bernate Ticino is also part of the Polo dei Navigli established by the Province of Milan.

History

Roman Age 
Archaeological excavations conducted by the Soprintendenza Archeologica della Lombardia in 2005 have brought to light a necropolis consisting of twelve inhumation tombs of late Roman age and a single burial of the first century A.D. Analysis of the evidence suggests that the small community must have had an economy based on agriculture and trade. Given the good quality of the material that it has been found, it can be assumed that the inhabitants must have enjoyed a certain wealth.

The Middle Ages 

The town of Bernate was in the past in the territory of the province of Pavia, but at the time of the land register of Maria Theresa it was part of the Pieve of Corbetta in the territory of the Duchy of Milan. Towards the middle of the eighteenth century Bernate also included the localities of Casate and Rubone. In the Middle Ages Bernate was called Brinate as it appears from a map of 1045, remembered by Giorgio Giulini (Memorie ecc. 1ª ed. Vol III, p. 427) in which Henry III, Holy Roman Emperor, confirmed to the monks of S.Dionigi in Milano the abbey with the church of S.Maria in Solariolo and some other lands. Important in those centuries was a castle, mentioned in a paper of 1098 containing a sale for 40 pounds of money that Algerio son of Vallone of Brinate had made to Ariberto priest. In this sale he had included all his properties, goods and rights that he owned in Inveruno and Trecate and in the place of Bernate except for the castle. Giulini handed us also the will that the priest Ariberto, buyer of the above mentioned funds made some months later (January 1099). In the will it is stated that the mother of the defunct Algerio, called Otta, was usufructuary of all those goods until her death. Of the property of the same goods, except the port on the fiume Ticino, he made two parts: "the first one he ordered that it was a portion of the church of Saint George of Bernate that belonged to the monastery of San Vincenzo of Milan, and the second one was the other portions of the same church that were not subject to patronage of any person". To this period are the information about the Crivelli family. It is in fact in the year 1150 that Giovanni of the Basilica of Sant'Ambrogio invested Domenico, Pietro, Pastore and Gualla Crivelli of the banks, gravels and woods that are in the territories of Brinasca (otherwise Bernate) and Cusionno (Cuggiono). The authority of the Crivelli family enlarged therefore to two feuds. It was in 1186, when on the papal throne sat with the name of Pope Urban III Uberto Crivelli who took place the foundation of the regular rectory at the church of Saint George. On 25 November 1186 Urban III addressed with a seal the parish of S. Maria di Crescenzago; after having explained that the church of Saint George di Brinate, founded on a paternal land was deprived of goods and of possessions, he assigned to the church of Saint George the goods bought by the nuns of Caronno except the port and the gravel of Ticino river, and those he had bought from the monks of San Vincenzo or from the soldiers of Arconate or from those of Dugnano. With such an abundance of goods, he founded at the church of Bernate the canonical congregation according to the rule of Saint Augustine.

From modern times to today 
In 1786 the district of Bernate was inserted in the Province of Pavia. In the Napoleonic age the district was aggregated to the one of Boffalora and then it was made independent again under the Austrians.
Until 1862 the town maintained the denomination of Bernate and then assumed that of Bernate Ticino with R.D. 14 December 1862, n. 1059.

In more recent times, the village appeared in the movie L'albero degli zoccoli of 1978 of the director Ermanno Olmi where, in a shot along the Naviglio Grande you can clearly see the dome of the parish church and the medieval bell tower.

Climate 
The climate in Bernate Ticino is mild, and generally warm and temperate. Bernate Ticino has a significant amount of rainfall during the year. This is true even for the driest month. The climate here is classified as Cfa by the Köppen-Geiger system. The average temperature in Bernate Ticino is 13.2 °C | 55.8 °F. In a year, the rainfall is 1301 mm | 51.2 inch. Precipitation is the lowest in January, with an average of 66 mm | 2.6 inch. With an average of 168 mm | 6.6 inch, the most precipitation falls in November. At an average temperature of 24.0 °C | 75.3 °F, July is the hottest month of the year. January has the lowest average temperature of the year, 2.6 °C | 36.6 °F.

Etymology of the name 
The etymology of the name of Bernate Ticino is uncertain. According to some studies the name would derive from the Latin language prunetum meant as a place for the cultivation of plums, then transformed with the late Latin into the suffix brunetum. According to other sources the name would be traced back to the Latin proper name Berinus. Another hypothesis is that the name would derive from Castrum Brinati (fourth century AD), i.e., the Roman name of a fortified area to guard a port on the Ticino river. The village is mentioned with the name of Brinate in a patent of the emperor Henry III in 1045. In those times it represented a "strong place" equipped with a castle, as the place was a passage towards the Ticino and towards Turbigo and therefore it was militarily important to keep the movements of civilians and soldiers under control through appropriate structures.

Festivals and Folklore Events 
The main religious event in Bernate is the Most Holy Name of the Blessed Virgin Mary, every second weekend of September. Typical is the procession with the boats on the Naviglio Grande on Saturday evening and the Regata Storica of Bernate Ticino (historical regatta) on Sunday afternoon. On 23 April, Bernate celebrates Saint George, protector of the town.

References

External links
 Official website 

Cities and towns in Lombardy